Tia Williams is an American novelist and editor. She has published six books and is best known for The Accidental Diva (2004), The Perfect Find (2016), and Seven Days in June (2021). She is also a long-time fashion editor and the current editorial director for the Estée Lauder Companies.

Early life and education 
Williams was raised in a suburban area of Virginia. She began writing during childhood and wrote her first book at age seven. She named The Westing Game as one book that shaped her into an aspiring writer. Williams received her bachelor's degree from University of Virginia in 1997. She moved to Brooklyn shortly after graduation and has lived there since.

Career 
Williams' professional writing career began in 2004, when she founded the fashion blog Shake Your Beauty. She also worked as an editor at publications including Essence, Glamour, Teen People, and Elle. Williams worked as the head copywriter at Bumble and bumble for five years. Since 2020, she has been the editorial director of the Estée Lauder Companies.

Williams published her first novel The Accidental Diva in 2004 during a resurgence of chick lit published by and about Black women. It received a positive review from Publishers Weekly, where her writing was praised: "Williams's gift for sexy if sometimes purple prose...save this energetic romance from being just another uptown girl meets downtown boy tale and signals the arrival of a sharp new talent."

In 2006, she co-authored the book The Beauty of Color with Iman. She also wrote two young adult novels, It Chicks and It Chicks: Sixteen Candles.

Williams released The Perfect Find in 2016 under Hachette, about a woman who takes a job as a fashion editor and falls in love with her frenemy manager's son. The book was adapted into a film produced by Netflix and Gabrielle Union, who also stars. A release date has not yet been announced.

In 2021, she released Seven Days in June, a novel about two writers who reunite after 15 years for a week-long affair. The protagonist lives with chronic migraines, a condition that Williams also has. After its publication it was named to the New York Times Best Seller list and was also selected for Reese Witherspoon's book club. Tembe Denton Hurst of New York reviewed the book positively: "It's been a while since I read a book I was delighted by — a book that made me smile wide for no reason because of how touching or cute it is. BookPage writer Jessica Wakeman gave it a starred review.

Seven Days in June is in development to be adapted into a television series produced by Will Packer Media with Williams as executive producer.

Personal life 
Williams married her husband in 2021. She has one child.

Works 

 
 Iman & Williams, Tia (2006).

Accolades 
 2016 – Independent Publisher Award for Multicultural Fiction, Bronze (for The Perfect Find)
 2016 – African American Literary Award for Best Fiction (for The Perfect Find)

References

External links 
 Official website

Year of birth missing (living people)
Living people
African-American women writers
Writers from Virginia
American women novelists
American young adult novelists
University of Virginia alumni
American cosmetics businesspeople
21st-century African-American people
21st-century African-American women